In mathematics, the Appell–Humbert theorem describes the line bundles on a complex torus or complex abelian variety.

Statement
Suppose that  is a complex torus given by  where  is a lattice in a complex vector space .

then

For the trivial Hermitian form, this just reduces to a character. Note that the space of character morphisms is isomorphic with a real torusif  since any such character factors through  composed with the exponential map. That is, a character is a map of the formfor some covector . In fact, this torus can be equipped with a complex structure, giving the dual complex torus.

Ample line bundles

Lefschetz proved that the line bundle , associated to the Hermitian form  is ample if and only if  is positive definite, and in this case  is very ample. A consequence is that the complex torus is algebraic if and only if there is a positive definite Hermitian form whose imaginary part is integral on

See also 

 Complex torus for a treatment of the theorem with examples

References

 

Abelian varieties
Theorems in algebraic geometry
Theorems in complex geometry